The Bird Lover, also known as The Prince as Bird, is a type of narrative structure in folklore, no. 432 in the Aarne–Thompson classification system. In the typical version of story, a woman acquires a bird lover—a nobleman in the shape of a bird—who is wounded by means of a trap set by the woman's husband, such as a set of sharp points set up outside the woman's window. She follows the wounded bird's trail, cures him, and then marries him.

In French scholarship, this type is often referred to as "loiseau bleu" or "the blue bird", so named for a story by Madame d'Aulnoy.

Origins
Folklorist Jack Haney traced the origins of the tale type to France and Germany in the Middle Ages.

An example of the motif is found in one of Marie de France's Lais, "Yonec", though the lai develops somewhat differently: instead of a happy ending, the lai ends in tragedy. A "sophisticated rationalization" of the type is found in Chrétien de Troyes's Lancelot, the Knight of the Cart, where Lancelot appears at Guinevere's heavily barred window and cuts his fingers bending the bars back.

Swedish scholar  also pointed Yonec as a predecessor to the tale type. However, he also noted that in tales of "later tradition", especially from India and Persia, the lover comes to the heroine in the shape of a bird, and in that regard cited the tale of "King Parrot", from a 15th century Turkish version of The Seven Wise Masters.

Overview
Some variants may begin akin to type ATU 425C, "Beauty and the Beast": the third daughter asks her father for a present, a memento that belongs to the Bird Prince that she will use to contact him. In other tales, the heroine is trapped in a high tower, which is only accessible by the prince in his bird form. Whatever its beginning, the heroine's lover is eventually hurt in his bird form by blades, pieces of glass or thorns left by the heroine's sisters. The Bird Prince vanishes back to his kingdom and the heroine goes after him intending to heal his wounds.

A line of scholarship (e.g., Aurelio Macedonio Espinosa Sr.) recognizes the independence of the narrative, but argues that it could fit as a subtype of the more general tale type ATU 425, "The Search for the Lost Husband", due to their proximity, e.g., in its motifs and in the heroine's quest for her lost supernatural husband.

Motifs
According to Samia Al Azharia Jahn, in Arabic language variants, the heroine asks her father for a strangely named object, which also happens to be the name of the Bird Prince. Jahn also noted that "in all Arabic variants", the Bird Prince is put in mortal danger by the use of glass.

In turn, according to Georgios A. Megas, the "characteristic motifs" of this type include the heroine overhearing the conversation between two creatures (animals, like birds and foxes) or two ogres about the prince's cure, the heroine killing the creatures (since their body parts are used in the cure), and the heroine asking the prince for a belonging as reward (a ring or towel).

Distribution
Haney stated the tale type enjoyed "worldwide distribution".

According to professors Stith Thompson, Anna Angelopoulou and Aigle Broskou, the tale type is "especially popular" in Mediterranean countries, being found in Iberian Peninsula and in Greece. In the same vein, professor Christian Abry stated that the tale type is "frequent" (fréquent) in Italy.

The ATU 432 folktype is also present in the folklore of Latin America, for instance, in Chile (The Parrot Prince). Further variants are found in Canada and New Mexico.

In the Typen türkischer Volksmärchen ("Turkish Folktale Catalogue"), by Wolfram Eberhard and Pertev Naili Boratav, both scholars identified a cycle of stories they classified as TTV 102, "Die Traube I" ("The Grape - Version I"), with 31 variants registered. These tales are comparable to the international tale type ATU 432, "The Prince as Bird".

German folklorists  and Manfred Hesse stated that the tale type was "widespread" in the Arab-speaking regions, although with different motifs.

See also
 Prince Sobur (Indian fairy tale)
 The White Bird and His Wife
 The Crow (fairy tale)

References

Bibliography
 Thompson, Stith. The Folktale. University of California Press. 1977. pp. 102–103 and 181. 

Folklore
Folklore studies
Literary criticism
Fictional princes
Fiction about shapeshifting
Female characters in fairy tales
Legendary birds
Birds in culture
Fictional birds
ATU 400-459